Yaacov Levanon (originally Yaacov Bilansky) (1895–1965) was an Israeli Jewish musician and composer in the British Mandate of Palestine and later Israel.

Levanon was born in Korets, Ukraine, the son of a haskalah scholar from Novohrad-Volynskyy (Samuel Bilansky). He was trained at the conservatory in Mykolaiv, Ukraine. After serving in the Red Army he emigrated in 1919 to Palestine, where he established himself as a composer and music teacher. His opus includes music for operettas, films (including the first Hebrew-language talking film, This is the Land [zot hi ha'aretz], 1935), instrumental pieces, and children's songs.

Yaacov Levanon, who taught in Arab schools in Jerusalem, was commissioned by the Grand Mufti of Jerusalem, Amin al-Husayni, to establish a children's orchestra to entertain, among other things, for the holiday Eid ul-Fitr. The relationship between them remained cordial until the 1929 Hebron massacre, in which the Mufti played a major role.

He died in Jerusalem, Israel.

External links
This is the Land / Zot hi-ha'aretz listing, Fritz Bauer Institut
Pictures of Y. Bilansky Levanon
Homepage of Prof. Haim Levanon

Israeli Jews
Israeli composers
Ukrainian Jews
Ukrainian SSR emigrants to Mandatory Palestine
1895 births
1965 deaths
20th-century composers